Henry George Charles Lascelles, 6th Earl of Harewood (9 September 1882 – 24 May 1947) was a British soldier and peer. He was the husband of Mary, Princess Royal, and thus a son-in-law of George V and Queen Mary and a brother-in-law to Edward VIII and George VI.

Early life and marriage

Lascelles was the son of Henry Lascelles, 5th Earl of Harewood, and Lady Florence Bridgeman, daughter of Orlando Bridgeman, 3rd Earl of Bradford. He was born at the London home of his maternal grandfather, 43 Belgrave Square.

Lord Harewood married Princess Mary, only daughter of George V and Queen Mary, at Westminster Abbey, on 28 February 1922. His best man was Sir Victor Mackenzie, 3rd Baronet.

After their marriage, Lord and Lady Harewood split their time between their homes; Chesterfield House in London, and Goldsborough Hall, part of the Harewood Estate and Harewood House itself, in Yorkshire, which became their family home in 1930, after the death of his father in October 1929.
They had two children:
 George Henry Hubert Lascelles, 7th Earl of Harewood (born at Chesterfield House 7 February 1923 – died 11 July 2011) and christened at St Mary's Church Goldsborough 25 March 1923
 Gerald David Lascelles (born at Goldsborough Hall 21 August 1924 – died 27 February 1998)

Their elder son, the 7th Earl of Harewood, wrote about his parents' marriage in his memoirs The Tongs and the Bones and describes their relationship, saying that "they got on well together and had a lot of friends and interests in common". He also noted that "Shy, aloof and worse, I have heard my father called since; but that was not how his friends knew him [or] how his family felt about him; and I knew then, and know still, that when I was 24 I lost potentially the best friend and mentor I could ever have – at precisely the moment I discovered this was so".

Military career
After education at Eton College, Lascelles attended the Royal Military College, Sandhurst before being commissioned as a second lieutenant into the Grenadier Guards on 12 February 1902, serving until 1905. He was an honorary attache at the British embassy in Paris from 1905 until 1907, then served as aide-de-camp to the governor general of Canada, Earl Grey, until 1911.

In 1913 he joined the Territorial Army as second lieutenant in the Yorkshire Hussars yeomanry. He was promoted lieutenant on the Reserve of officers in 1914. He continued with the yeomanry after the outbreak of the First World War until he rejoined the Grenadier Guards for service on the Western Front in April 1915. Even so, he continued to be promoted within the regiment to captain in 1917. Postwar he was promoted major in 1920 and retired in 1924.

Meanwhile, at the front, he was wounded in the head at the Second Battle of Givenchy but recovered to fight in the Battle of Loos in 1915, and was wounded a further two times as well as gassed. He was promoted captain and later major in command of a battalion (the 3rd) in 1915, and lieutenant-colonel in 1918. He was awarded the Distinguished Service Order (DSO) and a bar both in 1918, as well as the French Croix de Guerre.

He continued his interest in the Territorial movement after the war, as honorary colonel of the 1st Battalion The London Regiment from 1923, the 5th Battalion West Yorkshire Regiment from 1937, and as president of the West Yorkshire Territorial Forces Association from 1928. He was also appointed in 1937 honorary air commodore of the 609 (West Riding) Bomber Squadron of the Auxiliary Air Force.

Other interests
After the war, Lascelles remained interested in local Yorkshire issues and events, often contributing to the Leeds Board of Management. He was president of the Yorkshire Rural Community Council. He was Lord Lieutenant of the West Riding of Yorkshire from 1927 until his death.

He was president of the Royal Agricultural Society of England in 1929 when that year's Royal Show was held at Harrogate.

Interested in equestrian sports, he served as Master of the Bramham Moor Hounds from 1921, was a steward of the Jockey Club, and co-editor of Flat Racing (1940) for the London Library.

Lord Harewood, a Freemason, served as Grand Master of the United Grand Lodge of England from 1942 to 1947.

Political career
As Viscount Lascelles, he attempted to enter the House of Commons in 1913. He stood as the Unionist candidate in the 1913 Keighley by-election. (The Liberal incumbent, Sir Stanley Buckmaster, had been appointed Solicitor General.) In the three-cornered fight that also included a Labour candidate, he came second to Buckmaster by 878 votes.

He did not seek election again, and his defeat led to a later distaste for politics. He declared in later life "every war in which Britain had been involved had been due to the inefficiency of politicians, and they began what soldiers had to end".

On succeeding to his father's earldom, he became a member of the House of Lords.

Death and legacy
Lord Harewood died of a heart attack on 24 May 1947 at the age of 64 at his home, Harewood House. He is buried in the Lascelles family vault at All Saints' Church, Harewood. Lady Harewood, the Princess Royal, survived him by almost eighteen years and died in 1965.

It is widely understood that Virginia Woolf based the character of Archduke Henry on him in her novel Orlando, a tribute to her lover Vita Sackville-West. Henry Lascelles was one of West's suitors. In the 2019 film Downton Abbey, Viscount Lascelles is played by Andrew Havill.

Honours and arms

British honours:
 Distinguished Service Order (DSO), with Bar – 3 June 1918 (Bar – 3 Apr 1919)
 Knight of the Garter (KG) – 27 February 1922
 Knight of Grace of the Order of St John of Jerusalem – 1 March 1923
 Territorial Decoration (TD) – 10 May 1929
 Knight Grand Cross of the Royal Victorian Order (GCVO) – 1 January 1934
 Personal Aide-de-Camp (ADC) – 1 February 1937

Foreign honours:
 Croix de Guerre 1914–1918 (France)
 Grand Cross of Order of Muhammad Ali (Egypt)
 Order of St Olav (Norway)

Ancestry

References

External links
 
 harewood.org
 goldsboroughhall.com

1882 births
1947 deaths
People associated with the University of Sheffield
Grenadier Guards officers
British Army personnel of World War I
Graduates of the Royal Military College, Sandhurst
Knights Grand Cross of the Royal Victorian Order
Knights of Justice of the Order of St John
Knights of the Garter
Companions of the Distinguished Service Order
Lord-Lieutenants of the West Riding of Yorkshire
Grand Masters of the United Grand Lodge of England
Henry
Conservative Party (UK) parliamentary candidates
6
People from Belgravia